Glenview High is an Australian television drama series produced by the Reg Grundy Organisation for the Seven Network between 1977 and 1978.

Story
English teacher Greg Walker (Grigor Taylor) transfers from the country to Glenview High, a tough high school in Sydney. He clashes with rebellious students Tony Moore (Brandon Burke) and Danny Smith (Brett Hinch ). Despite his toughness, Tony has a grudging respect for Mr Walker while Danny is only interested in being popular with the female students.

Other staff at the school are efficient yet sympathetic principal Margaret Gibson (Elaine Lee), and cynical science teacher Harry Carter (Bill Kerr) who regards all  students as the enemy.

Greg's home life is also shown. He moves in with his brother Tom (Ken James), who boards platonically with flight attendant Robbie Dean (Rebecca Gilling) and the ditzy Jill Beamish (Camilla Rountree).

Guest stars 
Many popular Australian actors had guest starring roles in episodes.

source: Classic Australian Television (publication and online, archived by Trove.
 Bruce Barry
 Tom Burlinson
 Alan Cinis
 Mike Dorsey
 James Elliot
 Anne Haddy
 Sheila Kennelly
 Elisabeth Kirkby
 Anne-Louise Lambert
 Tracy Mann
 Monica Maughan
 Ray Meagher
 Tex Morton
 Thelma Scott
 Fiona Spence
 Sigrid Thornton
 Rowena Wallace
 Bettina Welch

References

External links

Glenview High at Classic Australian Television
Glenview High at the National Film and Sound Archive
Glenview High at AustLit

Australian drama television series
Australian high school television series
Television shows set in Sydney
1977 Australian television series debuts
1979 Australian television series endings
Television series produced by The Reg Grundy Organisation
Australian television soap operas
English-language television shows